Yours for a Song is an American game show, created by Bob Russell, that aired on ABC from 1961–1963 with Bert Parks as host and Johnny Gilbert as announcer. The series, which filmed in New York City, aired in primetime from November 14, 1961 to September 18, 1962 and in daytime from December 4, 1961 to March 29, 1963. This program was replaced by the soap opera, General Hospital, which was ABC's first "modern-day" soap the following Monday.

Gameplay
Two contestants alternated picking songs, then singing their lyrics each with six words missing. For each correct word the contestant filled-in, he/she won a cash award ($10 in daytime, $20 in nighttime); if the contestant was wrong, no money was awarded for that word and Parks would gently prod them in the direction of the word until it was correctly guessed. After the contestant finished their song, Parks led the audience in a singalong.

Each contestant played two songs and the contestant who earned the most money became champion and returned for the next game. If a champion won five games in a row, he/she retired undefeated. Each episode featured two games.

Songs
The songs used on the show came from the early twentieth century. These included "Daisy Bell", "Toot Toot Tootsie", and "Meet Me in St. Louis, Louis".

Episode status
The series is believed to have been destroyed as per network practices of the era. Two 1963 episodes (January 29 and March 25) are held by the UCLA Film & Television Archive.

Later use of the concept
The concept of filling in lyrics to a song as part of a game show would later be revived on the late-2000s shows The Singing Bee and Don't Forget the Lyrics!

References

External links
 

Musical game shows
1961 American television series debuts
1963 American television series endings
1960s American game shows
American Broadcasting Company original programming
Black-and-white American television shows
English-language television shows
Lost American television shows